Ruben Vardanyan may refer to:

Ruben Vardanyan (politician) (born 1968), Armenian-Russian entrepreneur, manager and philanthropist
Ruben Vardanyan (wrestler) (1929–1996), Armenian wrestler